The Fiji Pro was an event on the WSL Championship Tour. The event was held at Namotu in Tavarua, Fiji, and ran from 1999 to 2008, and then was resurrected in 2012. The competition was cancelled in 2018 due to lack of a sponsor.

Naming
Since the birth of this competition it had different names. From 2013 to 2016 it was sponsored by Volcom. In 2017 it was sponsored by Outerknown.

Results

Men's

Women's

See also

 Roxy Pro Gold Coast
 Quiksilver Pro France
 Quiksilver
 Roxy

References

External links
 

 
World Surf League
Surfing competitions in Fiji
Recurring sporting events established in 2008
Surfing in Fiji